Amnesty is a pardon extended by the government to a group or class of persons.

Amnesty may also refer to:
Amnesty (2011 film), a 2011 Albanian drama film
Amnesty (2019 film), a 2019 Slovak-Czech thriller film
Amnesty (I) (album), a 2016 album by Crystal Castles
Amnesty Act, an act that removed restriction from secessionists in the American Civil War
Amnesty clause, a salary cap provision in the National Basketball Association (NBA)
Amnesty International, a human rights organization
Amnesty the game, a game related to Amnesty International
Amnesty for Polish citizens in the Soviet Union
Amnesty of 1947, a law for soldiers and activists of the Polish anti-communist underground
Clapper v. Amnesty International USA, a US Supreme Court case dealing with a challenge to Section 702 of the Foreign Intelligence Surveillance Act
Tax amnesty, an opportunity for forgiveness of a tax liability
Amnesty (novel), the fifth novel from Aravind Adiga